Venugopal Madathil (born 5 June 1966) is an Indian cinematographer. Over his 75 film produced career, Madathil has worked with the several prominent directors of Malayalam film industry. Some of them include Sibi Malayil, A. K. Lohithadas, Jayaraj, Kamal, V. M. Vinu, Rajasenan, Ente Veedu Appuvinteyum, Joker, Pallavur Devanarayanan, Meghamalhar.

Early life
Madathil. is the son of renowned Ayurveda Doctor Late M.N. Panicker. When he joined for engineering, cinematography and the film industry was in his mind. His passion for photography grew when he spent his free time during his studies in his uncle's studio.

Career
After his course, his father 's close friend Mr. M. T. Vasudevan Nair introduced him to Mr. Jayanan Vincent. He was appointed as Vincent's assistant for the next film "Uyaranagalil". Unfortunately, before he could step into the film industry, Madathil's father died. He put a temporary stop to his ambitions and returned home. 
After a long interval he returned to the film industry as an assistant for M T Vasudevan Nair's "Anubandam". This was a turning point in Madathil's life. He also worked as an independent cameraman for the Tamil film "Pournami Rojakkal". His first independent Malayalam film was Mr. Kaladharan's "Ellarum Chollanu".

Filmography
POURNAMI ROJAKKAL
Ellarum Chollanu
Sudhinam
Saadaram
Three Men Army
Aadyathe Kanmani
Achan Rajavu Appan Jethavu
Sathyabhamakkoru Premalekhanam
Sundari Neeyum Sundaran Njanum
Tom & Jerry (film)
Padanayakan
Swapna Lokathe Balabhaskaran
Malayala Masom Chingam Onnu
Ishtamanu Nooru Vattam
Dilliwala Rajakumaran
Sibiram(1997)
Vamsam (1997 film)
Kilukil Pambaram
Mayaponman
Snehasindooram
Anuragakottaram
Kusruthi Kuruppu
HARTHAL
Vismayam
Ormacheppu
Tokyo Nagarathile Viseshangal
Pallavur Devanarayanan
Vardhakya Puranam
Tharavadu (film)
Mayilattam (film)
Njan Kodiswaran
SHUDDHA MADDALAM
Kinnaripuzhayoram
Kaattile Thadi Thevarude Ana
AAKASHATHEKKORU KILIVAATHIL
Porutham
Arayannangalude Veedu
CHILLAKSHARANGAL
Joker (2000 film)
Nakshathragal Parayathirunnathu
Aaraam Jaalakam
Cover Story (2000 film)
Megasandesam
Ishtam (2001 Malayalam film)
Meghamalhar
Aayirathil Oruvan (2009 film)
KADHA
Mr. Brahmachari
Ente Veedu Appuvinteyum
Nammal
Kakkakarumban
Jalolsavam
Alice in Wonderland (2005 film)
Ravanan
Ashwaroodan
Aanachandam
Amrutham 
9 KK Road
Black Cat (2007 film)
College Kumaran
Hareendran Oru Nishkalankan
Panthaya Kozhi
Rahasya Police
Evaraina Epudaina
Subapradam
MANCHIVADU
Cowboy (2013 film)
BLACKBERRY
GOOD BAD & UGLY
Appavum Veenjum
Marupadi

Venugopal was Jury member of the 52nd Kerala State Film Awards 2021.

References

1966 births
Living people
Artists from Kozhikode
Malayalam film cinematographers
Telugu film cinematographers
20th-century Indian photographers
21st-century Indian photographers
Cinematographers from Kerala